Worth–Jefferis Rural Historic District is a national historic district located in East Bradford Township and West Bradford Township, Chester County, Pennsylvania. It encompasses 42 contributing buildings and 5 contributing sites in rural Chester County. It includes a variety of vernacular stone farmhouses, Pennsylvania bank barns, and farm outbuildings. Notable properties include the Georgia Farm (1740), Glen-Worth Farm, Barr Farm, Lucky Hill Farm, Blue Rock Farm, Allerton Farm, Barry Farm, and Sarah Baldwin Farm. Located within the district is the separately listed Carter-Worth House and Farm.

It was added to the National Register of Historic Places in 1995.

References

Historic districts on the National Register of Historic Places in Pennsylvania
Historic districts in Chester County, Pennsylvania
National Register of Historic Places in Chester County, Pennsylvania